Tribeni Sahai Misra (born 15 November 1922 in Mahona; died 24 October 2005 in Lucknow) was an Allahabad High Court Judge. He was later the Chief Justice of the Gauhati High Court. He was the Governor of Assam and Meghalaya.

References

External links
 Biography

Governors of Meghalaya
Governors of Assam
Chief Justices of the Gauhati High Court
Judges of the Allahabad High Court
1922 births
2005 deaths